Serbia–Venezuela relations are foreign relations between Serbia and Venezuela. Serbia is represented in Venezuela through its embassy in Brasília (Brazil). Venezuela is represented in Serbia through its embassy in Belgrade.

Agreements 
Minister of Foreign Affairs of the Republic of Serbia, Vuk Jeremić and the Minister of Foreign Affairs of Venezuela Nicolas Maduro signed two cooperation agreements on political and educational aspects, and agribusiness and energy projects  in 2010.

Bosnian war 
In 1993, during the Bosnian War, Venezuela was a member of the United Nations Security Council, and argued strongly for, and voted to impose sanctions on Serbia and Montenegro over their support for Bosnian Serbs in battles with Bosnian Croats around Srebrenica.

Kosovo independence
After the 2008 Kosovo declaration of independence, Venezuelan President Hugo Chávez announced that Venezuela does not recognise Kosovo's independence on the grounds that it has been achieved through U.S. pressure, saying "This cannot be accepted. It's a very dangerous precedent for the entire world."  On 24 March 2008, Chávez accused Washington of trying to "weaken Russia" by supporting independence for Kosovo. He called Kosovo's new leader, Prime Minister Hashim Thaçi, a "terrorist" put in power by the U.S. and noted that the former rebel leader's nom de guerre was "The Snake". Chávez had strongly opposed the NATO intervention in Kosovo in 1999 when he first became president. As of 2010, Venezuelan diplomats continued to offer their support to Serbia in "their struggle against separatism".

Cultural and sporting relations
Serbia's Ministry of Internal Affairs has sponsored cultural relations such as volleyball matches between Serbia and Venezuela.

See also 

 Foreign relations of Serbia
 Foreign relations of Venezuela
 Yugoslavia and the Non-Aligned Movement

References

External links 
 Serbian Ministry of Foreign Affairs about relations with Venezuela

 
Venezuela
Bilateral relations of Venezuela